The Flecheiros are one of the uncontacted peoples in the Javari region of the Amazon. Their ambiguous name simply means "arrow shooters".

Language

Ethnographically, the people are similar to the Kanamarí. However, a meeting between a Kanamarí and the Flecheiros was observed, showing that the two have different languages. Their language is thus unknown and therefore unattested.

History

In September 2017, the Brazilian government investigated a reported massacre in August of about 10 members of the tribe who were gathering eggs along a river when they were killed by gold miners. The miners had bragged about "cutting up the bodies and throwing them in the river."

In popular culture 
The Flecheiros are the subject of a film called The Unconquered: In Search of the Amazon's Last Uncontacted Tribes, by Scott Wallace. The 2011 National Geographic edition details the 76-day expedition in 2002, led by famed indigenous activist Sydney Possuelo, who attempted to find the status of the Flecheiros in the Vale do Javari Indigenous Land.

References

Indigenous peoples of the Amazon
Uncontacted peoples
Unattested languages of South America